The Farmington Canal, also known as the New Haven and Northampton Canal, was a major private canal built in the early 19th century to provide water transportation from New Haven into the interior of Connecticut, Massachusetts and beyond. Its Massachusetts segment was known as the Hampshire and Hampden Canal.  With the advent of railroads, it was quickly converted to a railroad in the mid-19th century and in recent years has been converted to a multi-use trail (a rails-to-trails project) after being abandoned for years.

The entire length of the canal right of way in Connecticut (covering 25 segments and a total area of 247.6 acres) from Suffield to New Haven was listed on the National Register of Historic Places in 1985 under the name "Farmington Canal-New Haven and Northampton Canal".  The 1984 NRHP nomination document provides a detailed history, and describes 45 separate bridges, aqueducts, weirs and other surviving features.

The Farmington Canal Lock in Cheshire, Connecticut, and the Farmington Canal Lock No. 13 in Hamden, Connecticut were listed separately on the National Register of Historic Places (NRHP) in 1973 and 1982, respectively.  Those are locks 12 and 13 out of 28 original locks on the canal.

Canal and railroad
Ground was broken for the canal in 1825 and by 1828 the canal was open from New Haven to Farmington. By 1835 the complete route to Northampton was finished and operating. The canal, however, was never successful financially. Competition with railroads threatened the canal. The New Haven and Northampton Railroad was built along the canal's right of way in 1848.  Joseph Earl Sheffield was involved with the financing of both the canal and railroad. This railroad merged with the New York, New Haven and Hartford Railroad in 1887. Portions of the railway were in use up until the 1980s. A two-mile section from the Main/Whiting Street intersection in Plainville to Townline Road sees limited use.

Aqueduct

The canal makers reached a problem at the "great level" (the level stretch of land between locks 8 and 9, which was the longest distance of the canal at the same water level; once the Farmington river was reached, the canal was about 50 feet above river level, and the canal and river could not merge, so the aqueduct was built. The 280-foot aqueduct was spanned with 7 arches, spaced 40 feet apart. The pillars that remained after the canal closed were noted as a state landmark in the 50s, but the 1955 flood damaged the pillars beyond repair, and they were removed in 1956–58. The aqueduct's remnants are now preserved as part of the Farmington Land Trust.

The Whitings basin
The Whitings basin, or Bristol basin, was located in Plainville, between Whiting Street and West Main Street. Edna Whiting built a general store, and had doors leading directly to the canal for drop offs. Whiting's general store sold a variety of jelly, spices, grains, etc. Other notable items that passed through and were dropped off at Bristol basin were the original Eli Terry clock weights, for the notable pillar and scroll clock.

Locks
Locks 1-8 have been demolished. Lock 12 is  restored and has movable lock gates to simulate function but does not actually function as a lock because there is not enough water flow to fill the lock, and the lock gates do not seal well enough to allow the lock to fill and raise the water level. The lock keeper's house at gate 12 has also been restored. Lock 13 is in the woods and overgrown. The lock keeper's house for lock 13 is no longer standing; the foundation and well remain behind the lock. Lock 14 is still recognizable; however, walls have collapsed, and the inside of lock 14 is dry. The lock keeper's house is still standing, and plans to convert it for municipal services building are planned.

Trail

During the 1990s, the railroad right-of-way was converted to a rail trail for recreational use.  The Farmington Canal Trail runs from downtown New Haven to Northampton, Massachusetts, closely following the path of Route 10.

See also
 Hampshire and Hampden Canal
 New Haven and Northampton Company
 Farmington Canal Trail
 National Register of Historic Places listings in New Haven County, Connecticut
 National Register of Historic Places listings in Southington, Connecticut
 National Register of Historic Places listings in Hartford County, Connecticut

References

External links

 Farmington Valley Greenway and the Farmington Valley Trails Council (FVTC)
  Farmington Canal Rail-to-Trail Association
 The Farmington Canal 1822–1847
Farmington Canal Greenway Vision Trail

Canals in Connecticut
Canals on the National Register of Historic Places in Connecticut
Buildings and structures in New Haven, Connecticut
Transportation in New Haven, Connecticut
Economy of New Haven, Connecticut
Predecessors of the New York, New Haven and Hartford Railroad
Non-railway predecessors of railway companies
Canals opened in 1835
National Register of Historic Places in Hartford County, Connecticut
National Register of Historic Places in New Haven, Connecticut
Transportation buildings and structures in New Haven County, Connecticut